Irchel is also the name of a hill in the city of Zürich, and of a campus of Zürich University located there.

The Irchel is an elevation in the Canton of Zürich, located at the Rhine between the Töss and Thur rivers, on the territory of Buch am Irchel, Berg am Irchel and Freienstein-Teufen, separating the Andelfingen and Bülach districts.
It is an outlying ridge of the Jura, rising to 694 m, lying east of the  Lägern. Historically, it was part of the Germanic Limes. The name is from a Helvetic word for "stag".

peaks:
Hochwacht 668.4 m
Forenirchel 656.4 m
Buechemer-Irchel Höhe 694 m

See also
List of most isolated mountains of Switzerland

References

Mountains of the canton of Zürich
Mountains of Switzerland under 1000 metres